Corbii Mari is a commune in Dâmbovița County, Muntenia, Romania with a population of 8,187 people. It is composed of nine villages: Bărăceni, Corbii Mari, Grozăvești, Moara din Groapă, Petrești, Podu Corbencii, Satu Nou, Ungureni and Vadu Stanchii.

References

Communes in Dâmbovița County
Localities in Muntenia